Mission Stadium was a multi-use stadium in San Antonio, Texas, USA. It was opened in 1947 as the stadium of the San Antonio Missions of the Texas League. Its final season was in 1964; V. J. Keefe Memorial Stadium replaced it in 1968 when minor league baseball returned to San Antonio. The capacity of the stadium was 10,000 spectators.

The ballpark was bounded by Mission Road (west and north, third base and left field); Mitchell Street (south, first base); and Steves Avenue (north and east, center field and right field). The site is currently a parking lot for an office complex, whose curvature near the streetcorner approximates the curvature of the old grandstand.

Sources
 "San Antonio at Bat: Professional Baseball in the Alamo City," David King, c.2004

External links
 Stadium history
Picture of Mission Stadium

Defunct baseball venues in the United States
Defunct minor league baseball venues
Baseball venues in San Antonio
Baseball venues in Texas
Defunct sports venues in Texas